Metropolitan Augoustinos Kantiotes of Florina (20 April 1907 – 28 August 2010) was a highly controversial bishop of the  Greek Orthodox Church. He was born in Paros in village of Piso Livadi.

Kantiotes was a defender of traditional Greek Orthodox beliefs and Greek nationalism. He was a writer of spiritual literature and is credited for the spiritual renewal of Greece, and the establishment of traditional Orthodox theology. He preached countless sermons, which have been recorded and distributed worldwide. For many years he was at the forefront of the anti-ecumenism movement; he believed that ecumenism contradicted the basic principles of Greek Orthodoxy. Kantiotes is known for his conservative activism and ideals; in 1952, he was the leader of a 1500-strong group that protested the "Miss Greece" pageant, denouncing what he saw to be an "exhibition of naked bodies", a "scandal" and an "orgy". Despite support from the Holy Synod of the Greek Church, he was unsuccessful in his campaign to ban beauty pageants; in fact, the 1952 pageant was attended by many, including former prime minister Konstantinos Tsaldaris, who was a prominent conservative politician, and the Athens Police Chief at the time.  Bishop Augoustinos also denounced the neo-paganism which he saw as implicit in the use of the Olympic flame. Augoustinos, who published over 80 books in Greek, of which over 25 have appeared in English, and other languages, was known as a classic writer, in the English speaking world of Orthodox Christianity.

In 1958, Greek theologian and professor at the University of Athens Panagiotis Trembalas testified to the Archdiocese of Athens that Augoustinos was mentally ill. In 1960, Metropolitan of Chios Panteleimon also testified that Augoustinos was mentally disturbed. On June 25 of 1967, the newly elected Archbishop of Athens, who was installed earlier the same year by the far right military dictatorship of Greece, ordained Augoustinos as Bishop of Florina. In 1971, with the support of dictator Georgios Papadopoulos, Augoustinos succeeded in demolishing the main historic cathedral in Florina St. Panteleimon and replaced it with a new Greek style structure. In 1972 with the aid of the army, which had been made available to Kantiotes by Papadopoulos, the historic church of Amyntaio and many others in the region of Florina were demolished. Augoustinos pointed to the "danger" of the old church buildings collapsing, but according to residents and recent church publications, the churches were purposely destroyed because they were of Slavic architectural style and contained Slavic inscriptions.

During the dictatorship Augoustinos also succeeded in removing abstract public art forms from the city, including a sculpture made by acclaimed Greek sculptor Dimitris Kalamaras, and in 1981 Augoustinos expelled from his diocese a priest for baptizing the infant son of Kalamaras. It was only shortly after his death in 2010 that the sculpture was re-installed in Florina, having been on display in the Athens metro since its removal. In the early 1990s, at the height of the dispute between Greece and North Macedonia, Augoustinos tried to prevent the marriage between a man in his diocese and a woman from the neighboring city of Bitola, but eventually allowed the marriage on the condition that they would not play any Slavic language songs at their wedding. During the same period, Augoustinos also organized protests in Florina to prevent the acclaimed filmmaker Theo Angelopoulos (who was critical of the dictatorship) from filming in Florina his newest movie The Suspended Step of the Stork.

Kantiotes died on 28 August 2010 of renal failure while in hospital in Florina for a stroke.

References

External links
Augoustinos Kantiotes' homepage
 Article about Kantiotes at Eleftherotypia

1907 births
2010 deaths
Greek Eastern Orthodox priests
Bishops of the Ecumenical Patriarchate of Constantinople
Greek centenarians
Men centenarians
Deaths from kidney failure
People from Paros
Eastern Orthodox bishops in Greece
20th-century Eastern Orthodox bishops
21st-century Eastern Orthodox bishops